Miguel Pereira may refer to:

 Miguel Pereira, Rio de Janeiro, a Brazilian municipality
 Miguel Pereira (film director) (born 1957), Argentine filmmaker
 Miguel Pereira (Angolan footballer) (born 1975), Angolan footballer
 Miguel Pereira Castillo (born 1947), Puerto Rican politician and public servant
 Miguel Pereira Forjaz (1769-1827), Portuguese general

Pereira, Miguel